Gallifrey One is an annual North American science fiction convention focusing primarily on the British television series Doctor Who and its spin-offs, Torchwood, K-9 and The Sarah Jane Adventures, with an additional emphasis on British and American science fiction television media, held each February in Los Angeles. The event bills itself as "the largest and longest-running annual Doctor Who convention in the world".  Sponsored by Gallifrey One Conventions and the Institute for Specialized Literature (ISL) Inc., a California not-for-profit organization, Gallifrey One has been held every year since 1990 in the greater Los Angeles area and has featured guests from a variety of genre television programs including Babylon 5, Star Trek, Alien Nation, Gene Roddenberry's Andromeda, Buffy the Vampire Slayer and Battlestar Galactica.

Gallifrey One is the formal name of the convention; the event has always featured the full name of the event, along with a play on the iteration as drawn from popular media, such as "Gallifrey One Across the Eighth Dimension" (from Buckaroo Banzai), "The Tenth Planet of Gallifrey One" (a Doctor Who reference), and "Gallifrey One's Fifteen Minutes of Fame" (a reference to the phrase coined by Andy Warhol).

The convention's annual charity auction is named for the late Lost in Space actor Bob May, a long-time guest and dealer at the event before his passing. The convention is family-friendly, with activities for children.

The Outpost Gallifrey website, originally set up to advertise the convention, became a very popular Doctor Who fan website internationally for many years, until it ceased operations in July 2009; the website address at that time reverted to providing convention information only.

List of Gallifrey One events

References

External links
 Gallifrey One website

Science fiction conventions in the United States
Doctor Who fandom
1990 establishments in California
Recurring events established in 1990